The 1976–77 Cypriot Second Division was the 22nd season of the Cypriot second-level football league. APOP Paphos FC won their 5th title.

Format
Fourteen teams participated in the 1976–77 Cypriot Second Division. All teams played against each other twice, once at their home and once away. The team with the most points at the end of the season crowned champions. The first team was promoted to 1977–78 Cypriot First Division. The last  team was relegated to the 1977–78 Cypriot Third Division.

Changes from previous season
Teams promoted to 1976–77 Cypriot First Division
 Chalkanoras Idaliou

Teams promoted from 1975–76 Cypriot Third Division
 Ermis Aradippou FC

Teams that reactive after Turkish invasion
 Neos Aionas Trikomou

League standings

See also
 Cypriot Second Division
 1976–77 Cypriot First Division
 1976–77 Cypriot Cup

References

Cypriot Second Division seasons
Cyprus
1976–77 in Cypriot football